Julio Sanguily Garritte was a Cuban independence activist and patriot. He was a Major General of the Cuban Liberation Army during the Cuban War of Independence. He was appointed head, in commission, of the division of Cuba and Bayamo . Major General. He landed with Maceo for "Duaba". He participated in the Ten Years' War and protested with Maceo in Baraguá in defense of the total and definitive independence of Cuba.

Origins
Julio Sanguily Garritte was born in Havana, on November 9 , 1845 . He was the second of three male children of a marriage of French origin.

His older brother, Guillermo Sanguily, emigrated from Cuba years before the outbreak of the Ten Years' War.

His younger brother, Manuel Sanguily, would participate with Julio in the Ten Years' War and in the preparations for the Cuban War of Independence.

Ten Years' War
He participated in the Ten Years' War in December 1868 , landing in Camagüey, together with his brother Manuel, on the Galvanic expedition .

He reached the rank of Major General of the Liberation Army of Cuba on May 1 , 1872 . He then received a cut by a machete in the foot, being crippled for the rest of his life, despite which, he continued in the war. As a result of these injuries, his assistants had to help him mount and dismount the horse.

He left the country with his brother, Manuel Sanguily in 1876 , to recover from his injuries and to search for weapons and supplies in the United States.

Fertile Truce and Cuban War of Independence
During the Fertile Truce, he remained linked to the Cuban independence clubs in the United States. Over time, he acquired American citizenship. He participated in various conspiracies, including the failed conspiracy that is historically known as the Manganese Peace, which occurred in 1890.

He could not participate in the Cuban War of Independence, as he was captured by the Spanish before the uprising in 1895. He was only released in 1898 and joined an expedition that landed in Cuba that year, towards the end of the Spanish-American War.

Later Years
During the Cuban Republic he did not intervene in politics, nor did he hold public office, unlike his brother Manuel. He died in Havana on March 23 , 1906, at the age of 60.

References

Bibliography
Encyclopedic Dictionary of Military History of Cuba. Part 1 (1510 - 1898) Volume I Biographies. Olive Green Editions. City of Havana, 2004.

1845 births
1903 deaths
Cuban generals
People of the Ten Years' War
19th-century Cuban military personnel
Cuban independence activists